Jang Ri-Ra (born May 4, 1969) is a South Korean team handball player and Olympic champion. She participated at the 1992 Summer Olympics in Barcelona, where she received a gold medal with the Korean national team.

References

External links

1969 births
Living people
South Korean female handball players
Olympic handball players of South Korea
Handball players at the 1992 Summer Olympics
Olympic gold medalists for South Korea
Olympic medalists in handball
Asian Games medalists in handball
Handball players at the 1990 Asian Games
Medalists at the 1992 Summer Olympics
Asian Games gold medalists for South Korea
Medalists at the 1990 Asian Games
20th-century South Korean women